Francis Joseph Cole FRS (3 February 1872 – 27 January 1959) was an English zoologist and a professor at the University of Reading for 33 years.

Education
Cole was born in London and educated at Sir Walter St. John's School, Battersea and Jesus College, Oxford.

Career
Cole was a lecturer in zoology at the University of Liverpool from 1897 until 1906, when he became Professor of Zoology at the University of Reading, the first holder of the post.  He then began setting up the Cole Museum of Zoology, encouraging overseas visitors to the Department to donate specimens. He remained at Reading until retiring in 1939, but carried on writing in retirement.  He wrote in particular on comparative anatomy and the history of zoology, after his early work on the morphology of fish.  His works included a "History of Protozoology" (1926), "Early Theories of Sexual Generation" (1930) and a "History of Comparative Anatomy from Aristotle to the Eighteenth Century" (1944).

He retired from Reading in 1939 being replaced by Prof Charles Henry O'Donoghue.

Awards and honours
Cole was elected a Fellow of the Royal Society (FRS) in 1926, and won the Neill Gold Medal of the Royal Society of Edinburgh in 1908. He was the 1950 Wilkins Lecturer.

References

1872 births
1959 deaths
English zoologists
Alumni of Jesus College, Oxford
Academics of the University of Reading
Academics of the University of Liverpool
Fellows of the Royal Society
People educated at Sir Walter St John's Grammar School For Boys